McNairy County is a county located in the U.S. state of Tennessee. As of the 2020 census, the population was 25,866. Its county seat is Selmer. McNairy County is located along Tennessee's border with the state of Mississippi.

Sheriff Buford Pusser, whose story was told in the Walking Tall series of movies, was the sheriff of McNairy County from 1964 to 1970.

McNairy County is the location of the Coon Creek Science Center, a notable fossil site that preserves Late Cretaceous marine shells and vertebrate remains (such as mosasaurs).

The postwar musical environment of the county played a pivotal role in the development of popular music. Influential disc jockey Dewey Phillips  hailed from Adamsville, Tennessee. Carl Perkins made the first recordings of his career in the home studio of Stanton Littlejohn at Eastview, Tennessee. Perkins and Elvis Presley had their first meeting at one of Presley's earliest road performances in Bethel Springs, Tennessee.

History

McNairy County was formed in 1823 from parts of Hardin County, and was named for Judge John McNairy.

Also, the history of McNairy County includes an almost unheard of very small school. The Trantham School was established in McNairy County, TN. It operated from 1922 through 1948; Grades we're 1 through 8. This was a one Teacher School.

County seat
Purdy was the county seat of McNairy County until 1890. Since then, Selmer has been the county seat.

Sheriff Buford Pusser
Buford Pusser served as the sheriff of McNairy County from 1964 to 1970. The courthouse and jail in Selmer were his base of operations. He gained prominence for his fight against illegal distilleries, bootleggers, gambling establishments, and corruption in the county. His story has been made famous in the Walking Tall series of movies starring Joe Don Baker, Bo Svenson, Brian Dennehy, Dwayne Johnson, and in numerous documentaries and books.

Newspapers
The oldest existing business in McNairy County is its newspaper, the Independent Appeal, which was founded as the McNairy County Independent in 1902. It is located in Selmer.

In 2008, Tom Evans, a former reporter and photographer for the Independent Appeal, formed his own weekly newspaper, The McNairy County News.

School District
The schools fall under the McNairy County School District. The superintendent is Greg Martin The district is a public school district, serving students in kindergarten through twelfth grade. It serves over 4,000 student with 8 schools.

Schools

Elementary Schools
Adamsville Elementary School
Mr. Danny Combs, Principal
Bethel Springs Elementary School
Mr. Terry Moore, Principal
Michie Elementary School
Dr. Matt Alred, Principal
Ramer Elementary School
Dr. Sondra Kiser, Principal
Selmer Elementary School
Mrs. Pamela Simon, Principal
Middle Schools
Selmer Middle School
Dr. Brenda Armstrong, Principal 
High Schools
Adamsville High School
Mr. Steve Killingsworth, Principal 
McNairy Central High School
Dr. Jerry Pyron, Principal

Board of education
The district's board of education has 7 members elected from each of the 7 districts that make up McNairy County.

Controversies
The Selmer Elementary School principal failed to report abuse claims after evidence revealed Principal Simon was notified of abuse allegations on numerous occasions between October 2021 and December 2021.The report states that Simon did not notify the Department of Children Services of these claims, which as a school employee is a violation of Tennessee law as a mandatory reporter.

Geography

The major highways U.S. Route 64 (east-west) and U.S. Route 45 (north-south) pass through McNairy County and intersect in Selmer. Between the late 1990s and mid 2010s, both highways were upgraded to four lane divided highways, giving the county quicker access to the surrounding areas. McNairy County's position on Route 64 places it on the historic Lee Highway, which stretches from New York to San Francisco.

State Highways 22 and 57 also pass through the county. SR 22 along the eastern portion intersecting with US 64 in Adamsville, and SR 57 through the southern portion intersecting with US 45 in Eastview.

Adjacent counties
Chester County (north)
Hardin County (east)
Alcorn County, Mississippi (south)
Hardeman County (west)

State protected areas
Big Hill Pond State Park

Demographics

2020 census

As of the 2020 United States census, there were 25,866 people, 10,022 households, and 6,724 families residing in the county.

2000 census
As of the census of 2000, there were 24,653 people, 9,980 households, and 7,135 families residing in the county.  The population density was 44 people per square mile (17/km2).  There were 11,219 housing units at an average density of 20 per square mile (8/km2).  The racial makeup of the county was 92.22% White, 6.23% Black or African American, 0.20% Native American, 0.13% Asian, 0.24% from other races, and 0.98% from two or more races.  0.93% of the population were Hispanic or Latino of any race.

There were 9,980 households, out of which 29.90% had children under the age of 18 living with them, 58.00% were married couples living together, 9.90% had a female householder with no husband present, and 28.50% were non-families. 25.90% of all households were made up of individuals, and 12.50% had someone living alone who was 65 years of age or older.  The average household size was 2.42 and the average family size was 2.89.

In the county, the population was spread out, with 23.60% under the age of 18, 8.10% from 18 to 24, 26.70% from 25 to 44, 25.60% from 45 to 64, and 15.90% who were 65 years of age or older.  The median age was 39 years. For every 100 females there were 94.20 males.  For every 100 females age 18 and over, there were 91.40 males.

The median income for a household in the county was $30,154, and the median income for a family was $36,045. Males had a median income of $30,028 versus $21,450 for females. The per capita income for the county was $16,385.  About 11.80% of families and 15.90% of the population were below the poverty line, including 19.00% of those under age 18 and 20.80% of those age 65 or over.

Parks and attractions
McNairy County is the site of  Big Hill Pond State Park, which is forested with timberland and hardwood bottomland.  The county is also the location of the Coon Creek Science Center, a notable fossil site, located in Leapwood over the Coon Creek Formation, which preserves Late Cretaceous marine shells and vertebrate remains (such as mosasaurs) left there 70 million years ago.

Communities

Cities

Adamsville
Bethel Springs
Eastview
Finger
Guys
Michie
Milledgeville (partial)
Ramer
Selmer (county seat)
Stantonville

Unincorporated communities

Acton
Chewalla
Falcon
McNairy
Purdy

Politics

McNairy County is currently overwhelmingly Republican. Even before the rapid trend of the upland South away from the Democratic Party, McNairy County – though not to the same extent as nearby Wayne, Henderson and Hardin Counties – was a Unionist Republican enclave in historically Democratic West Tennessee. Research in the 1910s suggested that Republicanism in Southern states tended to be associated with areas having less productive soils. In west central Tennessee, which includes McNairy County, soils are shallow, humus-poor and easily erodible Highland Rim soils, which were much less suitable for plantation farming than the rest of Middle and West Tennessee.

See also
National Register of Historic Places listings in McNairy County, Tennessee

References
38.  The Trantham School https://www.amazon.com/dp/B00E99DHV2/

External links

Official site
McNairy County Chamber of Commerce

McNairy County at TNGenWeb
Arts in McNairy Homepage
McNairy Central High School
Reminiscences of the Early Settlement and Early Settlers of McNairy County, Tennessee
Let’s Call It Finger: A History of North McNairy County and Finger, Tennessee and Its Surrounding Communities
A History of Mount Carmel Cemetery and Meeting House, McNairy County, Tennessee

 
1823 establishments in Tennessee
Populated places established in 1823
West Tennessee